Chirr is a Sino-Tibetan language spoken by the Chirr Naga (Yimkhiung) community in northeast India. It is related to other Yimkhiungrü language and is sometimes considered as a dialect of the Yimkhiung Nagas.

References

Naga people
Languages of Nagaland
Ao languages